Rick Lawson (born 1973, Raymond, Mississippi, United States) is an American soul, blues and R&B singer. He began his singing career at the age of four as the lead vocalist for the W&W Jr. Spirituals in Raymond. When Lawson became an adult, he ventured into singing Southern blues and, in 1994, the Jackson Music Awards of Jackson, Mississippi, presented him with an award as the Most Outstanding New Artist of the Year.

During his career, Lawson has performed with B.B. King, Bobby "Blue" Bland, Johnnie Taylor and Tyrone Davis. Lawson is signed with Ecko Records of Memphis, Tennessee.

External links
 Rick Lawson biography on Ecko Records

1973 births
Living people
People from Raymond, Mississippi
21st-century American singers
21st-century American male singers